Mount Albert Edward is a  mountain in the Wharton Range in Central Province, Papua New Guinea. The mountain consists of two peaks about 400 metres apart, a cross marks the top of the slightly higher western peak and a trig station marks the eastern peak. The mountain lies approximately 120 km north of Port Moresby.

The first recorded ascent was in 1906 by C A W Monckton. There were further ascents in the early 20th century, but the first detailed account was made in 1935 following an ascent by Richard Archbold and Austin L. Rand in 1933.

References

Further reading

 
 

Albert Edward